Henry Brady may refer to:

 Henry Bowman Brady (1835–1891), British micropalaeontologist
 Henry E. Brady, American political scientist